Elizabeth Warden may refer to:
Elizabeth Warden (swimmer) (born 1978), Canadian swimmer
Elizabeth Warden (Keeping Up Appearances), a character from the British television show Keeping Up Appearances

See also
Elizabeth Arden (1881–1966), Canadian-American cosmetics businesswoman
Elizabeth Arden, Inc., her company
Elizabeth Warren (born 1949), U.S. senator since 2013 and 2020 presidential candidate